Nicole Aniston is an American pornographic film actress. She was the 2013 Penthouse Pet of the Year.

Early life 
Aniston grew up in Escondido and Temecula in Riverside County, California. She attended Temecula Valley High School.

Career 
Aniston's first credited adult film was released in 2009 with the adult studio Sticky Video. Aniston began working with Reality Kings in late 2010. Aniston starred alongside in a raunchy Cum Catcher scene that was released via Reality Kings in October 2010 and she also starred in the All Hunnies group sex scene with Rebeca Linares and Bill Bailey which was promoted via Reality Kings in November 2010. From this time on Aniston started to appear in a wide range of popular porn productions. Aniston's raunchy scene with Mike Adriano in the Bang Bros compilation title Big Tit Creampie #13 (2011) which won “Best Internal Release” at the 30th AVN Awards. Her work in the Elegant Angel movie Hard Bodies (2011) that was nominated for “Best All-Sex Release” at the 29th AVN Awards and “Gonzo Release of the Year” at the 2012 XBIZ Awards. Aniston's group sex scene with Angel Vain, Buddy Davis and Pauly Harker in the Bang Bros DVD Ass Parade #32 (2011) that was nominated for “All-Sex Release of the Year” at the 2012 XBIZ Awards and her group shoot with Anissa Kate, Misty Stone, Skin Diamond and Karlo Karrera in the Marc Dorcel film In Bed With Katsuni (2012) which was nominated for “Best Gonzo Movie” at the 2012 Erotic Lounge Awards and “European Non-Feature Release of the Year” at the 2013 XBIZ Awards.

In early 2012, Aniston began modeling for Penthouse. She won Pet of the Month in August 2012 and Pet of the Year in 2013.

In 2012, Aniston began working with Brazzers. Her first Brazzers scene was shot with successful co-star Johnny Sins. Aniston began doing work and shot Office 4-Play: Christmas Eve Edition! group shoot with Chanel Preston, Krissy Lynn, Tanya Tate and Keiran Lee in December 2012.

In late 2017, Nicole Aniston took part in season 2 of the fan-favorite Brazzers House web series which showed fans what goes on when 10 leading porn stars lived together in a mansion. Fans voted for their favorite Brazzers House contestants with the winner taking home a $20,000 grand prize. Aniston made it all the way to the final whereupon she participated in Brazzers House 2 Finale group sex scene with Abella Danger, Kelsi Monroe, Monique Alexander, Skyla Novea, Charles Dera, Danny Mountain, Isiah Maxwell, J-Mac, Keiran Lee, Ricky Johnson, and  Xander Corvus. The final scene showcased in the Brazzers DVD Brazzers House #2 (2018) which was nominated for "Best Gonzo Movie" at the 36th AVN Awards.

Aniston launched her own website in 2013. The website is a subscription-based service that allows fans to view exclusive content in the form of photos, gifs and high definition video. Her site has won numerous industry awards including "Most outrageous site", "Best Pornstar site" and "Best Web director" at the annual AVN Awards.

In 2018, Aniston teamed up with Fleshlight to develop a realistic Aniston-based sex toy. Aniston is also involved in feature dancing in 2017, 2018, and 2019 Aniston made appearances at clubs across the United States meeting fans and dancing at local strip clubs.

Parodies 
Over the years Aniston has attracted a global fan base due to her scenes in many porn parodies. Aniston starred in the Septo Studios spoof OMG…It’s The Flashdance XXX Parody (2011) that was nominated for “Best Music Soundtrack” at the 2013 AVN Awards. She appeared in the Wicked Pictures parody Spartacus MMXII: The Beginning (2012) which won “Best Parody: Drama” at the 2013 AVN Awards. Aniston also starred in Hustler Video's release This Ain’t The Smurfs XXX (2012) that was nominated for “Best 3D Release” at the 2013 AVN and XRCO Awards and she starred in the Exquisite production Xena XXX: An Exquisite Films Parody (2012) which was nominated for “Adult Parody of the Year” at the 2013 Sex Awards.

One of Nicole Aniston's most popular porn parodies has been the Wicked Pictures''' production Men In Black: A Hardcore Parody (2012). Directed by Brad Armstrong, the sci-fi spoof featured Aniston in a three-way with Kaylani Lei and Armstrong that was nominated for “Most Outrageous Sex Scene” at the 2013 AVN Awards. Many of these scenes have been showcased in the Brazzers compilation titles Brazzers Presents: The Parodies #6'' (2016) which was nominated for “Best Parody” at the 2018 AVN Awards.

Personal life 
Aniston is an open user of cannabis, even smoking it during adult films. She is an advocate for the decriminalization of non-medical cannabis in the United States as well as the use of medical cannabis. Aniston is of mixed German and Greek heritage.

Filmography

Television

See also 
 List of pornographic performers by decade
 List of pornographic actors who appeared in mainstream films

References

External links 

Official website

Nicole Aniston at the Internet Adult Film Database
Nicole Aniston at the Complete Details

Year of birth missing (living people)
Living people
American female adult models
American people of German descent
American people of Greek descent
American pornographic film actresses
Penthouse Pets
Penthouse Pets of the Year
People from California
American cannabis activists
21st-century American women